Wisoot Wichaya (also Visuth Vichaya) is a Thai football coach. He was formerly the coach of Bangkok Bank FC and has also coached the national under-23 team at the 2006 Asian Games.

References

Living people
Wisoot Wichaya
Wisoot Wichaya
Wisoot Wichaya
Southeast Asian Games medalists in football
Year of birth missing (living people)
Competitors at the 1981 Southeast Asian Games